Trachyodynerus is a monotypic genus of potter wasps known from Saudi Arabia. The sole species is Trachyodynerus sauditus.

References

Monotypic Hymenoptera genera
Potter wasps